The Tanami ctenotus (Ctenotus tanamiensis)  is a species of skink found in the Northern Territory and Western Australia.

References

tanamiensis
Reptiles described in 1970
Taxa named by Glen Milton Storr